St. Simon & St. Jude Church, known colloquially as Tignish Church is a 19th-century Roman Catholic church located in Tignish parish, Prince Edward Island, Canada. As of 2006, it is the single largest church on Prince Edward Island, measuring 185 feet high. It can be clearly seen for 6 miles on flat land, and for many more miles at sea. It is perhaps most famous for its widely publicized apparition of Jesus event.

The church, along with the local post office, is one of the few original structures in Tignish remaining in excellent condition. Surrounding churches include Immaculate Conception Church located 6 miles SW of Tignish in Palmer Road, as well as Greenmount United Church located 5 miles S of Tignish. Many from outside the official parish, such as those in Palmer Road or Alberton parishes, will attend the church.

History
Although religious services were held in Tignish by its residents since the very foundation of Tignish in 1799, an established place of worship was not produced for a further two years. In 1801, the Acadian settlers of the community built a log church that measured 30 by 25 feet. Although they had no priest, the settlers would gather at the church and read prayers from the Gospel every week.

In 1826 the log church was destroyed to make way for a new, larger building. This building measured 60 by 45 feet and was located in the same area.

It was in 1844 that the area of Tignish was finally construed as a parish. With the arrival of new priest Peter MacIntyre, the church received major indoor renovations and MacIntyre became the first resident parish priest of Tignish. He is considered one of the most prominent and iconic religious leaders of the Tignish area, and one of the most favored priests, he also served the third-longest as priest, from 1844–1860. In 1851 MacIntyre introduced church organ into the establishment and in the same year the church was hauled from its location to a new location near the Dalton Schoolhouse.

Construction of the church
With the assistance of many volunteer workers from Tignish and outlying areas, construction on the present–day St. Simon & St. Jude Church began in 1857 and was made entirely of an outer domestic brick structure and wood on the inside. The twelve tall and large columns located in the church were made of only one large tree that was extracted from nearby Center Line Road by bobsled and horses.

The construction of the church was completed, to an extent, in 1860, and was also consecrated in this year. André Roy was the parish priest at the time and would quickly be succeeded by Dugald M. McDonald in 1861. The amateur photographer Henry J. Cundall visited the church in 1862 and photographed it, after climbing the spire a year or two earlier.

Famous organ
In 1882 a 1,118–pipe hand–pumped church organ, was installed by long–standing priest Dugald M. McDonald. Although the organ was purchased for $2,400.00 CAD in 1882, its current retail value is an estimated $1 million USD. The organ was featured in many of the documentation done by Henry Gaudet, a former member of the parish. It has also been featured on many local newscasts and newspapers. The organ was manually operated by hand pump until electricity was first provided in Tignish in 1959. The organ still resides at the church to the present day.

Renovations and other history
In 1888, parishioners decided that the interior of the church needed redesigning. Redecoration was done to lighten interior colors and brighten the overall mood of the establishment. Approximately $3,100.00 was raised by locals to allow for renovation.

Also in 1888, a large amount of decoration was added to the interior. A Montreal painter, François Meloche, was brought in to paint the life–size portraits of the 12 apostles as well as the stained glass windows and Stations of the Cross paintings. Until 11 September 1888, Meloche would continue to reside in Tignish and performed other minor renovations, such as painting the church different shades of grey.

No other major renovations were performed at the church from 1888 to 2001, however many minor renovations such as painting and roof construction has been performed.

Recent developments (2001–present)

Renovations
In 2001, the interior of the church was resculpted, including the addition of bright shining sticker stars in the ceiling. The ceiling was also painted in blue, and many other renovations were performed.

Jesus apparitions
In March 2006, local woman Angela Callaghan saw what she believed was the face of either Jesus or the Virgin Mary in a cloth that was part of the church's Easter decorations. Within the day, local television news crews flocked to the church to document the event. The story also appeared in all the Prince Edward Island newspapers. Many persons claimed to have been "transformed" by the vision.  The church's then-pastor, James Willick, had no explanation of the event.  "We shouldn't try to decide all the meanings or signs this might be," he said. "We can get into danger by doing that. Best for us to pray about it and maybe see it as a blessing".

The following year another parishioner claimed to have seen images of both Jesus and the Virgin Mary in the wood of a cross in the sanctuary.

See also
Tignish
Immaculate Conception Church
Harper Road, Tignish
Ascension, Tignish
St. Felix, Tignish
Palmer Road, Tignish

References

Roman Catholic churches in Prince Edward Island
Churches in Prince County, Prince Edward Island
Heritage sites in Prince Edward Island
Roman Catholic churches completed in 1860
19th-century churches in Canada